Fuel (previously called Fields of Fuel) is a 2008 documentary film directed by Josh Tickell and produced by Greg Reitman, Dale Rosenbloom, Daniel Assael, Darius Fisher, and Rebecca Harrell Tickell.

It won the audience award at the 2008 Sundance Film Festival. The DVD was released on June 22, 2010.

Editing
According to director Josh Tickell, since its appearance at the Sundance Film Festival, the film has gone through major editing changes and additions. The name was changed from Fields of Fuel to Fuel. This edited film is a re-cut of the same film with 45 minutes of new material in its total 112-minute running time.

Reception
The film has a 72% approval rating from critics on Rotten Tomatoes based on 18 reviews.

Awards
 2008 Sundance Film Festival Winner - Audience Award
 2008 AFI Dallas Film Festival Winner - Current Energy Earth Friendly Award
 2008 Sedona Film Festival Winner - Most Compelling Documentary
 2008 Sedona Film Festival Winner - Best Screenwriting
 2008 Santa Cruz Film Festival - Producer's Award
 2008 Gaia Film Festival Winner - Audience Award, Best Documentary
 Nominated – 61st Writers Guild of America Awards - Best Documentary Screenplay

References

External links
 
 
 Full movie available on Youtube

2008 films
2008 documentary films
Environmental films
American documentary films

Documentary films about alternative energy
Documentary films about peak oil
Films set in California
American independent films
Films directed by Josh Tickell
2000s English-language films
2000s American films